The Croatian State Archives are the national archives of Croatia located in its capital, Zagreb. The history of the state archives can be traced back to the 17th century. There are also regional state archives located in Bjelovar, Dubrovnik, Gospić, Karlovac, Osijek, Pazin, Rijeka, Sisak, Slavonski Brod, Split, Varaždin and Zadar.

History
The Croatian State Archives trace their origin to a 1643 decision of the Croatian Sabor in which the Kingdom's treasurer (blagajnik) Ivan Zakmardi is instructed to create an inventory of all the laws, charters and other documents. This was followed by the commission to construct a special chest at the Kingdom's expense which would house the most important documents in the aforementioned inventory. The chest only had symbolic meaning, since it could only house a negligible amount of documentation and was located on the grounds of the Bishopric of Zagreb. The number of laws and regulation were subsequently passed in relation to archiving documents.

The Croatian Parliament named Ladislaus Kiraly as the first archivist of the kingdom in 1744, transferring the chest and the rest of the documentation to the Saint Mark's square in 1763.

See also
 National Library of Croatia
 List of national archives
Croatian Film Archive

References

External links 
 
  
 Hrvatski državni arhiv 

Croatia
Croatian culture
Archives in Croatia
Art Nouveau architecture in Zagreb
Art Nouveau government buildings